Guzmania musaica is a plant species in the genus Guzmania. This species is native to Costa Rica, Panama, Ecuador (Esmeraldas, Imbabura), Venezuela and Colombia (Antioquia, Choco, Narino, Norte de Santander, Valle del Cauca).

Description
Leaves are about two feet long, simple, with entire margins, spineless, light green with reddish and dark green transverse striations. In the central rosette of leaves grows a long stem topped by a beautiful inflorescence of pink-red bracts with many waxy tubular yellow flowers arranged in spikes. The plant blooms from June to August. The fruits are septicidal capsules. After it has produced its fruits, the plant dies.

Habitat
It grows as an epiphyte in rain forests.

Cultivars
 Guzmania 'Golden King'

References

External links
FCBS Bromeliad Photo Index Database
Hortipedia
HowStuffWorks

musaica
Flora of Costa Rica
Flora of Panama
Flora of South America
Plants described in 1873
House plants